Mahatma Gandhi Memorial Medical College, also known as MGM Medical College, is an Indian medical college established at Jamshedpur in 1961. It is one of the six medical colleges in Jharkhand which are completely run by the government , it is best college among all the six colleges of jharkhand.

History
During its inception it was a private medical college in un-carved Bihar state. In 1977 this college was taken over by the Bihar government.   Now it falls under the newly separated Jharkhand state since 15 November 2000.

Previously the college was affiliated to Ranchi University, Ranchi. Since the inception of regional  Kolhan University, Chaibasa on 12 August 2009, the college has been under its affiliation.

Location
MGM Medical College is in India's steel city, Jamshedpur. When the college started, it was 6 kilometers away from the city centre, in the foothill of dalma range . there was nothing except paddy fields nearby. Over a period of time, the city has expanded. The college's hospital is in Sakchi.

Admissions
The students are admitted through NEET exam conducted by National Testing Agency (NTA).

Courses
These are the courses offered:

Undergraduate
 MBBS

Post graduate diploma
 DCH (diploma in Child Health)
 DGO (diploma in Obst-Gynae)
 DMRD

PG Courses                                     

M.D. (General Medicine)          3

M.D/M.S. (Anatomy)                  1

M.D. (Physiology)                      1

M.D./ M.S. (Obs. & Gynae.)      1

M.S. (Orthopedics)                    1

M.D. (Anesthesiology)              1

M.D. (Paediatrics)                       2

M.S. (General Surgery)              2

M.D. (Pathology)                         2

M.S. (Ophthalmology)              2

M.S. (Otorhinolaryngology)    2

D.GO.                                               1

D.C.H.                                              1

D.M.R.D.                                          1

Total                                              21

Affiliations
The college is recognised by the Medical Council of India and is currently affiliated to Kolhan University.

Notable alumni
 Misa Bharti, MP in Rajya Sabha

References

External links

Universities and colleges in Jharkhand
Medical colleges in Jharkhand
Education in Jamshedpur

Hospitals in Jamshedpur
Hospitals in Jharkhand